Sülzetal is a municipality in the Börde district in Saxony-Anhalt, Germany. Sülzetal was established on April 1, 2001 by the merger of the former municipalities Altenweddingen, Bahrendorf, Dodendorf, Langenweddingen, Osterweddingen, Schwaneberg, Stemmern and Sülldorf. The Sülze valley is characterized by artesian aquifers, delivering brine (sulza) that had been used for salt production.

Seats in the municipal assembly (Gemeinderat) as of 2004 elections:
 Social Democratic Party of Germany: 8
 Christian Democratic Union: 6
 Association of Independent Voters: 2
 Free Democratic Party: 1
 Culture and Sports Club Osterweddingen: 1
 Free Voters Schwaneberg: 1
 The Left: 1

The first documentation of a settlement in the area dates back to 937 with the mention of Osterweddingen and Sülldorf. The village of Langenweddingen and Dodendorf were mentioned in 946 and 978 respectively as a possession of Saint Maurice's Abbey at Magdeburg. On May 5, 1809 the churchyard of Saint Christopherus at Dodendorf was the site of an attack by Prussian freikorps troops under Ferdinand von Schill and Ludwig Adolf Wilhelm von Lützow against the army of Napoleonic Westphalia. Lützow was severely wounded and had to face a court-martial for his arbitrary act.

The villages of Dodendorf, Osterweddingen and Langenweddingen have access to the railway line from Magdeburg to Thale, served by the Veolia Verkehr company since 2005. On July 6, 1967 the level crossing at Langenweddingen was the scene of one of the worst train accidents in Germany, when a bilevel train hit a tanker truck, resulting in an explosion that killed 94 people, many of them children on their way to a summer camp in the Harz mountains.

The letter processing center for the greater Magdeburg area is located in Sülzetal.

Notable people 
 Friedrich Aue, resistance fighter, born July 27, 1896 at Dodendorf, died November 27, 1944 at Brandenburg an der Havel
 Heinz Weitzendorf (born 1931), composer and conductor

References

Börde (district)